The 2014 Interprovincial Hurling Championship, known as the 2014 M Donnelly Hurling Interprovincial Championship due to the tournament's sponsorship by businessman Martin Donnelly, is the 85th series of the Interprovincial Championship. The annual hurling championship between the four historic provinces of Ireland is contested by Connacht, Leinster, Munster and Ulster.

Munster are the defending champions.

Fixtures/results

Interprovincial Championship

References

External links
 M Donnelly Interprovincials official website

Railway Cup Hurling Championship
Interprovincial Hurling Championship
Hurling